Viktoria Vitalyevna Borzenkova (born 25 December 1981) is a Russian former pair skater. With Andrei Chuvilaev, she won the 2001 and 2003 Winter Universiade and 2004 Bofrost Cup on Ice.

Career 
Borzenkova began skating at the age of five and switched from singles to pairs at 16, teaming up with Andrei Chuvilaev. Early in their partnership, they were coached by Ludmila Koblova in Moscow. They finished seventh at the 2002 European Championships and 15th at the 2002 World Championships. They formed an unusual pair due to their height, she being 168 cm tall and he 200 cm. In April 2003, they moved to Saint Petersburg and began working with Oksana Kazakova and Tamara Moskvina. The pair retired from competition in 2006.

Borzenkova appeared on Dancing on Ice in 2008, partnered with Tim Vincent. She coaches at the "Happy Ice" Figure Skating School in Moscow.

Programs 
(with Chuvilaev)

Competitive highlights 
(with Chuvilaev)

References

External links 
 

1981 births
Russian female pair skaters
Living people
Figure skaters from Saint Petersburg
Universiade medalists in figure skating
Universiade gold medalists for Russia
Competitors at the 2001 Winter Universiade
Medalists at the 2003 Winter Universiade